The Half-Mile Telescope was constructed in 1968 (2 aerials) at the Mullard Radio Astronomy Observatory with two more aerials being added in 1972, using donated dishes (total cost was £70,000). Two of the dishes are fixed, while two are moveable and share the One-Mile's rail track; to obtain information from the maximum number of different baselines, 30 days of observing were required. Observing frequency 1.4 GHz (21 cm wavelength), bandwidth 4 MHz. Used for Hydrogen Line studies of nearby galaxies and produced the first good radio maps of hydrogen distribution (as a function of its velocity), for M33 and M31 (also produced nearly 20 PhDs and 50 published papers). The telescope was operated by the Radio Astronomy Group of the Cambridge University.

External links
 Two antennae of the Half-Mile Telescope on Google Maps

Cavendish Laboratory
Radio telescopes
Interferometric telescopes